Richard Pollard may refer to:

 Richard Pollard (MP) (fl.1515–1542), English MP
 Dick Pollard (1912–1985), England Test cricketer
 Dick Pollard (footballer) (1913–1966), Australian rules footballer